Fairmont Commercial Historic District is a national historic district located at Fairmont, Robeson County, North Carolina. The district encompasses 31 contributing buildings in the central business district of Fairmont.  It includes buildings built between about 1898 to 1960 in a variety of popular architectural styles, including Italianate and Modern Movement.  Notable buildings include the Rawls Motor Company (1952), McDaniel Hardware (1949, c. 1954), Floyd and Floyd (1960), A. L. Jones Building (1912), Big Brick Warehouse (1931, c. 1940), and Fairmont Depot (1898).

It was added to the National Register of Historic Places in 2010.

References

Historic districts on the National Register of Historic Places in North Carolina
Italianate architecture in North Carolina
Buildings and structures in Robeson County, North Carolina
National Register of Historic Places in Robeson County, North Carolina